Mary Rasmussen may refer to:
 Mary Helen Rasmussen, American musicologist, writer and editor
 Mary Rasmussen (politician), British politician